Juan de Dios Ventura Soriano (8 March 1940 – 28 July 2021), better known as Johnny Ventura nicknamed , was a Dominican singer and band leader of merengue and salsa. The merengue legend was a legislator of the Lower House between 1982 and 1986. He also served as vicemayor of Santo Domingo from 1994 to 1998, and as mayor of Santo Domingo from 1998 to 2002.

Early history
He began his career as a singer when he presented himself with some friends in a program of devotees which was broadcast by La Voz de la Alegría weekly. The young Ventura, only 16 years of age, obtained first place of the participants. A little later, he started appearing in the programs of devotees which were sponsored by La Voz Dominicana. When Ventura Soriano appeared for the first time in the TV show: La TV busca una estrella, that was broadcast Friday night at seven, they rang the bell. In the following week, like a champion, Juan de Dios returned to be welcomed in the same competition. He practiced, worked and was crowned for the hit. Then he won first prize. Thereupon he won a lot of prizes in the devotees programs, until he was finally rewarded with the much desired scholarship which the broadcasting company, property of José Arismendy Trujillo Molina, gave for young talents. With La Voz Dominicana Juan de Dios studied music, vocal techniques and expression. This made Ventura one of the most famous singers in Latin America.

Political career
Ventura was elected Deputy to the National Congress from 1982 to 1986.

He was Vice Mayor of Santo Domingo, Capital of the Dominican Republic, from 1994 to 1998.  

He was Mayor of Santo Domingo, Capital of the Dominican Republic, from 1998 to 2002.

Musical career
In 1959, Juan de Dios decided to take the name 'Johnny Ventura'. He started his career as a singer in several bands that presented themselves at the dances in La Feria. He worked with the orchestra of Rondón Votau and in 1961 with the band of the Dominican percussionist Donald Wild.

In 1962 he sang with Combo Caribe of Luis Pérez, with whom he recorded Cuidado Con el Cuabero, of which he was the author, and La Agarradera, of Luis Pérez. It was with this band that he recorded his first LP consisting of 12 songs.

In 1963, Johnny Ventura was recruited by the musical director Papa Molina to join La Super Orquesta San José, of which he was the director at that time. He joined as singer and as player of the güira. For two years Ventura was part of La Super Orquesta with stars such as Vinicio Franco and Grecia Aquino. Although no records remain of this group, this period was a landmark in his career.

In 1964, the Cuban impresario Angel Guinea insisted that Johnny Ventura create his own orchestra, the "Combo Show" which is known as an important part of the history of popular Dominican music.

In 1965, with his orchestra, Ventura recorded for the Fonogram label the albums La Coquetona, La Resbalosa and El Turun Tun Tun. In 1967 he travelled to the United States, where he immediately became a star. He is credited with the song "La muerte de Martin", with the voice of Luisito Martí, the Combo Show made their first golden record with Ah..! Yo No Se... No (1971).

In 1999, Ventura was inducted into the International Latin Music Hall of Fame and won the Lifetime Achievement Award from the same organization in 2003.

In 2006, Ventura was presented with the Latin Grammy Lifetime Achievement Award by the Latin Recording Academy in recognition of his career.

He has been compared to American singer Elvis Presley.

Personal life and legacy 
On 28 March 2020, Ventura announced that he had tested positive for COVID-19 during the COVID-19 pandemic and was hospitalized. On 13 April 2020, he announced he had recovered and had tested negative for the coronavirus.

Ventura died from a heart attack on July 28, 2021,  at the age of 81.

Ventura's son, Jandy, also a musician who has branded himself as "El Legado" (The Legacy), released Yo Soy El Merengue with his father eight months after his death. It's unclear whether they recorded the song before Johnny's death or whether Jandy used an old, unreleased recording of Johnny. Jandy also collaborated with Milly Quezada and Carlos Vives to released Buscando Al Caballo (Homenaje a Johnny Ventura) on en May of 2022.

Discography
 La Agarradera Vol. 4 (1962)
 Cuidado con el Cuabero (1963)
 El Llorón (El Florón) (1964)
 1920 y Otros Éxitos (1964)
 El Turun Tun Tun (1965)
 El Boogaloo Está en Algo (1965)
 La Resbalosa (1965)
 Siempre Pa' Lante (1966)
 Figurando (1966)
 El Papelito Blanco (1967)
 Noches en Quisqueya (1968)
 El Mamito (1968)
 Siempre en Órbita (1969)
 El Guataco (1970)
 Más Éxitos (1970)
 Ah..! Yo No Se... No (1971)
 Salsa y Algo Más... (1971)
 ¿Tú Sabes a Qué Yo Vine? Te Digo Ahorita (1972)
 Bambaraquiti (with Joseito Mateo) (1972)
 Traigo Mi Salsa... Pa' Tu Lechón (1972)
 Navidades En Merengues y Salves (with Rafael Colón) (1972)
 El Pingüino (1973)
 Acompaña a Sus Creaciones (1973)
 ...De Nuevo Presente (1973)
 Salsa! (1973)
 La Protesta de los Feos (1974)
 Un Poquito Para Atrás: Mamá Tingó (1974)
 El Hijo del Pueblo (1975)
 En Acción (1975)
 12 Aniversario (1976)
 ¡El Que Venga Atrás Que Arree! (1976)
 Solo Para Bailadores (1976)
 Excitante (1977)
 El Disco Rayao (1977)
 2 Aces al Tiro (with Rolando Laserie) (1977)
 Navidades Dominicanas (with Luis Alberti) (1977)
 Amar Es Vivir (with Rafael Colón) (1978)
 Presentando a Mi Nueva Cosecha (1978)
 En Su 15 Aniversario (1979)
 Yo Soy el Merengue (1980)
 Johnny Mucho... Mucho Johnny! (1981)
 Lo Que Te Gusta (1981)
 El Sueño (1982)
 Flying High (Volando Alto) (1983)
 Concierto de Amor (with Rafael Colón) (1983)
 Y Buena Que Está... María (1984)
 El Hombre y Su Música (1985)
 Navidad Sin Ti (1985)
 Capullo y Sorullo (1986)
 El Señor del Merengue (1986)
 Si Vuelvo a Nacer (1987)
 El Caballo... Una Leyenda (1988)
 Ayer y Hoy (1989)
 Quisqueya y Borinquen (1990)
 Éxtasis (1990)
 35 Aniversario Con Sus Invitados (1992)
 Siempre (1993)
 Retoñando (1994)
 El Gran Encuentro del Combo Show (1995)
 Como el Café (1996)
 Sin Desperdicio (2003)
 103 Boulevard (2006)
 Volvió la Navidad (2009)
 El Viejo Ta' en la Calle (2013)
 Tronco Viejo (2016)

Compilations 
 12 Grandes Éxitos (1960)
 Vamos a Bailar Merembé (1968)
 Super Hits (1973)
 En Alas de Quisqueyana (1976)
 Super Hits Vol. 3 (1977)
 Salsa y Más Salsa (1977)
 Por el Campeonato Mundial! (with Wilfrido Vargas) (1977)
 Sonido Negro (1979)
 14 Éxitos de Johnny Ventura (1981)
 Las Tapas (1981)
 Un Saludo al Diputado: 14 Éxitos Vol. 2 (1982)
 Classic: Con Su Sabor Original (1985)
 16 Éxitos (1987)
 20 Éxitos en Salsa (1991)
 Los Reyes del Merengue (con Wilfrido Vargas) (1991)
 12 Golden Hits (1993)
 Grandes Éxitos (1993)
 The Best (1994)
 Brillantes (with Sergio Vargas) (1994)
 El Rey y la Reina del Merengue (con Milly Quezada) (1996)
 Cara a Cara (with Sergio Vargas) (1997)
 El Disco de Oro (1997)
 40 Aniversario: En Vivo (1998)
 Palo Bonito (1999)
 20th Anniversary (1999)
 Merenguero Hasta la Tambora (2000)
 Oro Merenguero (2000)
 El Oro del Caballo Negro (2001)
 22 Ultimate Hits Series (2002)
 Serie Azul Tropical (2003)
 Soy (2004)
 10 de Colección (2005)
 ¡Oye Que Rico Mami... Salsa! (2006)
 20 Éxitos Originales (2006)
 El Rey del Merengue (2007)
 Mis Favoritas (2011)

References

External links
 
 

1940 births
2021 deaths
20th-century Dominican Republic male singers
Dominican Republic songwriters
Male songwriters
Latin Grammy Award winners
Latin Grammy Lifetime Achievement Award winners
Latin music songwriters
Mayors of places in the Dominican Republic
Merengue musicians
People from Santo Domingo
Afro-Dominican (Dominican Republic)